Esquipulas Airport  is an airstrip serving the city of Esquipulas in Chiquimula Department, Guatemala.

See also
 
 
 Transport in Guatemala
 List of airports in Guatemala

References

External links
 OurAirports - Esquipulas
 OpenStreetMap - Esquipulas
 FallingRain - Esquipulas Airport
 

Airports in Guatemala
Chiquimula Department